Willem Cornelis Bokhoven (4 February 1901 - 19 May 1982) was a Dutch male water polo player. He was a member of the Netherlands men's national water polo team. He competed with the team at the 1924 Summer Olympics.

References

External links
 

1901 births
1982 deaths
Dutch male water polo players
Water polo players at the 1924 Summer Olympics
Olympic water polo players of the Netherlands
Sportspeople from Gouda, South Holland
20th-century Dutch people